Hélène Guisan-Démétriadès ( Démétriadès, born 16 November 1916) is a Swiss Vaud writer, poet and teacher.

Guisan-Démétriadès was born in Istanbul, Ottoman Empire on 16 November 1916. She came to Switzerland at the age of six. After studying literature and years of teaching Ancient Greek, she married the Vaud councilor .

She translated Greek tragedies into French and wrote many articles of spiritual reflection. She is also the author of La Tierce présence a work which was awarded the Prix Ève Delacroix of the Académie française in 1995.

Sources
   in the Cantonal and University Library of Lausanne
 Back page of Les Carnets du silence (2002) 
 A D S - Autorinnen und Autoren der Schweiz - Autrices et Auteurs de Suisse - Autrici ed Autori della Svizzera

External links 
 Hélène Guisan-Démétriadès on the site of the Académie française
 Les carnets du silence on La Procure

1916 births
Possibly living people
Constantinopolitan Greeks
Swiss people of Greek descent
Swiss women poets
Swiss writers
Emigrants from the Ottoman Empire
Immigrants to Switzerland
Writers from Istanbul